Clive Edward Payne (born 2 March 1950) is an English former professional footballer.

Payne, a right back, began his career with Norwich City. He was a member of the team that won the second division championship in 1972 and reached the final of the League Cup in 1973.

Payne made 150 appearances for Norwich, scoring three goals. He left the club in November 1973 to join AFC Bournemouth, where his career was ended by injury.

Honours
 Second division championship 1972
Clive payne also had a small sports shop.

Sources

1950 births
Norwich City F.C. players
English footballers
AFC Bournemouth players
Living people
People from Aylsham
Association football defenders